Michael Martin Kofler (born 9 April 1966) is an Austrian flutist. Since 1987 he has been solo flutist with the Munich Philharmonic.

Training 
Born in Villach, Kofler received his first flute lessons at the age of ten. Later he was a young student at the conservatory in Klagenfurt. At the University of Music and Performing Arts Vienna he completed his studies in concert and pedagogy with Werner Tripp and Wolfgang Schulz. Subsequently, he studied postgraduate with Peter Lukas Graf at the City of Basel Music Academy. Kofler also took lessons with Aurèle Nicolet as well as András Adorján and André Jaunet. In 1987 Kofler became principal flutist in the international Gustav Mahler Jugendorchester under Claudio Abbado.

Career 
At the age of only 21, Kofler was appointed solo flutist with the Munich Philharmonic in 1987. Since 1989 he has been teaching flute at the Mozarteum University Salzburg, as the youngest professor in Austria at the age of 23.

Competition successes 
 1983 and 1985: 1st prize each time in the Austrian competition Jugend musiziert
 1987: 1st prize in the Mercadante competition
 1990: 2nd prize at the ARD International Music Competition.

Private life 
Kofler's wife Regine (born 1971 in Munich) was the solo harpist of the Hofer Symphoniker.

References

External links 
 Michael Martin Kofler and Regine Kofler 
 

Austrian classical flautists
Academic staff of Mozarteum University Salzburg
1966 births
Living people
People from Villach